Zhao Puchu (November 5, 1907 – May 21, 2000) was a religious and public leader who promoted cultural progress and religious tolerance in China.  Zhao was best known as president of the Buddhist Association of China and also one of the most renowned Chinese calligraphers.

Zhao also served as vice chairman of the 9th National Committee of the Chinese People's Political Consultative Conference and honorary chairman of 10th Central Committee of China Association for Promoting Democracy.

He began his work in the 1930s, serving as secretary of the Buddhist Association of China.  Zhao also worked to foster relations with Japan, serving as vice president of the China-Japan Friendship Association from 1958 to 1989, and working as an adviser to the association after.  He led a Chinese religious delegation to Japan in 1992, meeting with then prime minister Kiichi Miyazawa and receiving the Grand Cordon of the Order of the Secret Treasure of Japan.

Honours
He was awarded the Niwano Peace Prize on April 9, 1985.

Zhao was outspoken against Falun Gong and supported its ban within China.
He died in Beijing, aged 92, in May 2000.

Publications 

 Answers to Common Questions about Buddhism
 The Buddhism

References

External links

1907 births
2000 deaths
People from Taihu County
Vice Chairpersons of the National Committee of the Chinese People's Political Consultative Conference
Republic of China Buddhists
People's Republic of China Buddhists
People's Republic of China politicians from Anhui
Buddhist religious leaders
20th-century Chinese people
Religious leaders in China